Mipus gyratus is a species of medium-sized to large sea snail, a marine gastropod mollusc in the family Muricidae, the murex snails or rock snails.

Description

Distribution

References

gyratus
Gastropods described in 1844